Montclair is an unincorporated community in Wilson County, North Carolina, United States.  It lies at an elevation of 108 feet (33 m).

References

Unincorporated communities in Wilson County, North Carolina
Unincorporated communities in North Carolina